Ronald Creagh (born 1929) is a sociologist and anarchist best known for his books on American intentional communities. He is a professor of American civilization in Montpellier.

Works 

 L'Anarchisme aux États-Unis, 1826–1886 (1981)
 Sociobiologie ou Écologie sociale by Murray Bookchin, translated from English to French (1983)
 L'Affaire Sacco et Vanzetti (1984, 2004 reissue)
 Laboratoires de l'Utopie. Les communautés libertaires aux Etats-Unis (1983)
 Nos cousins d'Amérique. Histoire des Français aux États-Unis (1988)
 La Déférence, l'insolence anarchiste et la démocratie (1998)
 Terrorisme, entre spectacle et sacré. Éléments pour un débat (2001)
 Shadows under the Lamp. Essays on September 11 and Afghanistan, co-author Sharif Gemie,	Angleterre	London :Freedom press,	(2003) 101 p.
 L'Imagination dérobée (2004)
 Utopies américaines. Expériences libertaires du XIXe siècle à nos jours (2009), an expanded version of Laboratoires de l'Utopie and twice its length

References 

1929 births
Historians of anarchism
French sociologists
20th-century French historians
People from Alexandria
People of intentional communities
Living people

French anarchists